Komishan (also Romanized as Komīshān) is a village in Mehravan Rural District, in the Central District of Neka County, Mazandaran Province, Iran. At the 2006 census, its population was 1,602, in 394 families.

References 

Populated places in Neka County